Y?N-Vee is the only studio album by R&B/Hip hop group, Y?N-Vee. It was released on October 18, 1994 as the debut release from PMP Records through the Rush Associated Labels division of Def Jam Recordings and was produced mostly by Doug Rasheed. The album was reached number 75 on the US R&B albums chart, while the album's lead single "Chocolate", reached the R&B singles chart.

Track listing
"Even When U Sleep"- 3:47  
"All I Wanna Do"- 4:44  
"4 Play"- 4:37  
"I'm Going Down"- 4:08  
"Sceamin'"- 5:28  
"Sonshine's Groove"- 5:19  
"Chocolate"- 4:25  
"Stra8 Hustler"- 3:45  
"Tricks-N-Trainin'"- 4:40  
"Y?N-Vee"- 4:37  
"Real G"- 4:56  
"Gangsta's Prayer"- 4:53  
"We Got a Good Thing"- 4:38

1994 debut albums
Contemporary R&B albums by American artists
Def Jam Recordings albums